Alongi is a surname. Notable people with the surname include:

Filippo Alongi (born 2000), Italian rugby union player
Nicola Alongi (1863–1920), Sicilian socialist leader
Philip Alongi, American news producer and opera singer
Umberto Alongi (born 1976), Swiss Italian singer-songwriter